The Far Eastern Mega Tower is a skyscraper located in Banqiao District, New Taipei, Taiwan. As of February 2021, it is the eighth tallest building in Taiwan and the tallest in New Taipei City. Designed by Taiwanese architect Kris Yao, the building was completed in 2013. Far Eastern Mega Tower is the seat of headquarter of Far Eastern Department Stores Co. Ltd.

See also 
 List of tallest buildings in Taiwan
 List of tallest buildings in New Taipei City

References

2013 establishments in Taiwan
Office buildings completed in 2013
Skyscraper office buildings in New Taipei